Julio Yarnel Rodríguez (born December 29, 2000), nicknamed "J-Rod", is a Dominican professional baseball outfielder for the Seattle Mariners of Major League Baseball (MLB). Rodríguez signed with the Mariners as an international free agent in 2017 and made his MLB debut in 2022, when he was named an All-Star and won the Silver Slugger Award and American League Rookie of the Year Award.

Early life
Rodriguez was born in Loma de Cabrera, a town of roughly 20,000 people, in the Dominican Republic.

Professional career

Minor leagues
Rodríguez signed with the Seattle Mariners at 16 years of age as an international free agent in July 2017 for a bonus of $1.75 million. He made his professional debut with the Rookie-level Dominican Summer League Mariners in 2018, playing primarily right field and batting .315/.404/.525 (7th in the league) with 50 runs, nine triples (tied for the league lead), five home runs, 36 RBI, and 10 stolen bases without being caught in 219 at-bats over 59 games. He was over three years younger than the average player in both leagues. He was named both a DSL mid-season All Star, and a Baseball America DSL All Star.

Rodríguez started 2019 with the Class A West Virginia Power in the South Atlantic League. He missed part of the season with a fractured left hand. He was promoted to the Class A-Advanced Modesto Nuts in the California League in August, becoming one of only three 18-year-olds in all of minor league baseball to play High-A ball in 2019. Over 328 at-bats in 84 games between the two teams playing right field and center field, he slashed .326/.390/.540 with 63 runs, 26 doubles, 12 home runs and 69 RBI, and was 10th in the South Atlantic League with a .490 slugging percentage. He was named a California League Player of the Week on September 2, and an MiLB Organization All Star. In September of 2019, he was the Mariners' No. 2 prospect, and the No. 25 prospect in baseball.

Rodríguez played in the Arizona Fall League for the Peoria Javelinas following the regular season, at 18 the youngest player in the AFL, and batted .288/.397/.365 in 52 at-bats. He was named an AFL Rising Star.

In June 2021, Rodriguez started play with the Everett AquaSox. After a few months he was promoted to the Double-A Arkansas Travelers. Rodríguez was selected to play in the All-Star Futures Game. In August 2021, he was ranked No. 1 on the Mariners prospect list and No. 2 on the MLB top 100 prospect list. The Mariners added him to their 40-man roster to protect him from the Rule 5 draft after the 2021 season.

Seattle Mariners
Rodríguez made his major league debut on Opening Day, April 8, 2022, as the starting center fielder versus the Minnesota Twins. After starting the season 1-for-21 with 12 strikeouts, Rodríguez took off. On May 1, Rodríguez hit his first career home run, a three-run shot off of Miami Marlins ace Sandy Alcántara. He was named American League (AL) Rookie of the Month consecutively for May and June, 2022. In June, he played 29 games, scored 22 runs, and hit .280/.361/.542 with seven home runs, 16 RBI, and five stolen bases. 

Rodríguez kept up his great performance in July, during the stretch the Mariners won 14 consecutive games to jump into playoff discussions. On July 15th, he hit his first career grand slam to put a game vs the Texas Rangers out of reach. In July, he played 19 games, scored 12 runs, and hit .267/.337/.547 with five home runs, 18 RBI, and two stolen bases. He however did not win rookie of the month in July with the award going to Jose Miranda who put up superior numbers. 

Rodríguez was selected to the 2022 MLB All-Star Game roster, making him the sixth Mariner rookie to do so. Rodríguez also participated in the Home Run Derby, where he hit 81 home runs across three rounds, and placed second behind Juan Soto.

During a game on August 23 against the Washington Nationals, Rodríguez hit his 20th home run of the 2022 season, making him the sixth player in Seattle Mariners history to join the 20–20 club, and the fourth player in MLB history to do so in their first MLB season. On September 14, he became the first player to join the 25–25 club in his debut season. On August 26, Rodríguez signed a 14-year contract extension worth up to $400 million with the Mariners.

In 2022, Rodríguez batted .284/.345/.509 (8th in the AL) with 84 runs, 28 home runs, 75 RBI, 25 steals (fifth), and 140 strikeouts in 511 at-bats, with a 26.4 power-speed number (second), while leading the AL outfielders in both range factor/9 innings (2.88) and errors (6). At 21 years of age, he was the youngest qualified batter in major league baseball. Rodríguez won the Silver Slugger Award and the AL Rookie of the Year Award.

Personal life 
Rodríguez is currently dating OL Reign Canadian professional soccer player Jordyn Huitema.

In January 2023, Rodríguez donated an ambulance to his hometown's civil defense headquarters. Prior to his donation, the town did not have an ambulance for emergency. He also gifted baseball equipment and toys to the children in his hometown.

Awards and accolades
Players Choice Award for AL Outstanding Rookie (2022)
Silver Slugger Award (AL Outfielder, 2022) 
Rookie of the Year Award (AL Outfielder, 2022)
All-MLB Second Team (AL Outfielder, 2022)

See also

 List of Major League Baseball players from the Dominican Republic
 List of Olympic medalists in baseball
 List of Silver Slugger Award winners at outfield
 Seattle Mariners award winners and league leaders

References

External links

2000 births
Living people
American League All-Stars
Arkansas Travelers players
Baseball players at the 2020 Summer Olympics
Dominican Republic expatriate baseball players in the United States
Dominican Summer League Mariners players
Everett AquaSox players
Leones del Escogido players
Major League Baseball outfielders
Major League Baseball players from the Dominican Republic
Major League Baseball Rookie of the Year Award winners
Medalists at the 2020 Summer Olympics
Modesto Nuts players
Olympic baseball players of the Dominican Republic
Olympic bronze medalists for the Dominican Republic
Olympic medalists in baseball
Peoria Javelinas players
Seattle Mariners players
Silver Slugger Award winners
West Virginia Power players
2023 World Baseball Classic players